Mesudarim (Hebrew: מסודרים, meaning "settled [for life]" in Israeli slang) is an Israeli comedy-drama series which was broadcast on Keshet, Channel 2, during 2007–2009. The series starts when four friends - Tomer Levi (Asi Cohen), Erez Klyner (Eran Zarhovich), Guy Fogel (Assaf Harel) and Sagi Berlad (Maor Cohen) - sell their gaming startup company to an American corporation for 217 million USD, and depicts how the very different childhood friends deal with their newfound wealth. Other leading actors in the show's two seasons are Dan Shapira, Nimrod Kamer and Dov Glickman.

Episode 9 contains a rare crossover in Israeli television, which is with the drama Betipul.

Shortly after the conclusion of season 2, creator Asaf Harel and Keshet stated that further seasons would not be produced.

The format of Mesudarim was purchased by Fox Broadcasting Company.

On 11 February 2010, a clip from the show presenting a new gaming product was mistakingly published on Gizmodo as an actual upcoming gaming innovation.

Loaded, a British remake of Mesudarim, started screening on Channel 4 on 8 May 2017. This version stars Jim Howick, Samuel Anderson, Jonny Sweet and Nick Helm.

References

External links 
 

Israeli drama television series
Israeli telenovelas
Comedy-drama television series
Channel 2 (Israeli TV channel) original programming
2007 Israeli television series debuts
2009 Israeli television series endings
2000s Israeli television series